Raggasonic are a French ragga group composed of Big Red (born Stéphane Joaquim), Daddy Mory (born Mory Samaké) and Frenchie 

They were discovered after the compilation Rapattitude was released in the early 1990s. Two official albums were released by Raggasonic: Raggasonic (1995) and Raggasonic 2 (1997), both produced by Frenchie. 

The two members of Raggasonic, Big Red and Daddy Mory each pursuing solo careers. In 2012 they came back with a new album, Raggasonic 3.

In popular culture
Their hit "Sors avec ton gun" was released in 1995 in conjunction with the cult French film La Haine directed by Matthieu Kassovitz.

Discography

Albums

Compilation albums

Singles

References

French rappers
French reggae musical groups